The Chemin de Fer Touristique du Tarn (CFTT), or Tarn Light Railway, is a narrow-gauge light railway near the village of Saint-Lieux-lès-Lavaur, in the vicinity of Saint-Sulpice in the department of Tarn, France. It is run as a heritage railway by a French association, the ACOVA (Association pour la Conservation Occitane de Véhicules Anciens) incorporated in 1975 and based in Toulouse.

Then it runs in the Tarn countryside and woods before arriving at the present terminus at les Martels.

The ACOVA owns five steam locomotives, among which three are operating and four are considered as monuments historiques. One of them is coming from New Caledonia and was originally in the 500mm gauge (Decauville 0-4-0T) and the others have been adapted from  gauge hardware.

The Tarn Light Railway is operating from begin of April to the end of October, on Sundays and holidays, and every day of the week in July and August. The trains perform a one-hour travel between the Saint-Lieux station and the Les Martels terminus.

It is planned to extend the line to reach the hamlet and chapel of Saint-Cyriaque.

As of 2008, the current ridership is 24,000 per year.

Steam engines in working order

See also
 Minimum-gauge railway
 Narrow gauge railway

References

"Tramways a Vapeur du Tarn" (English Language)   Author - Sarah Wright, Publisher - The Oakwood Press

External links
 CFTT, official web site

Tarn
500 mm gauge railways in France
Tarn (department)
Railway lines in Occitania (administrative region)
Monuments historiques of Occitania (administrative region)
Tourist attractions in Tarn (department)